Roger Brabandt (born December 3, 1946) is an American politician. He has served as a Republican member for the 5th district in the North Dakota House of Representatives  since 2011.

References

1946 births
Living people
People from McHenry County, North Dakota
Businesspeople from North Dakota
Republican Party members of the North Dakota House of Representatives
People from Minot, North Dakota
21st-century American politicians